Ang Tatay Kong Nanay (My Father, My Mother) is a 1978 Filipino comedy-drama film that tackles parenting and homosexuality, and how it is not an issue in raising a child. The movie was directed by Lino Brocka and written by Orlando Nadres.

Plot
The story revolves around Coring (Dolphy), a gay beautician who was in love with a younger man named Dennis (Phillip Salvador). Dennis had gotten his prostitute girlfriend Mariana (Marissa Delgado) pregnant, but the two couldn't handle the responsibility yet. Dennis then entrusts his child Nonoy (Niño Muhlach) to Coring, as he is set to leave the country, because he needs to work overseas to support the youngster. At first, Coring was hesitant but was easily convinced because he wants Dennis to have a better future. The child grew up with Coring and Nonoy believed that he is indeed his father. However, the story takes another turn as Mariana returns.  The film tackles the hardships of being a single parent and at the same time, the judgment towards homosexuality and parenting.

Cast
 Dolphy as Coring
 Nino Muhlach as Nonoy
 Phillip Salvador as Dennis 
 Marissa Delgado as Mariana Jimenez
 Lorli Villanueva as Bebang
 Soxy Topacio as Bading
 Orlando Nadres as Crispino
 Larry Leviste as Rodrigo
 Renee Salud as Sabrina
 Inday Badiday as Herself

Awards
The movie won Nino Muhlach a Famas Award in 1979 while Dolphy and Marissa Delgado for the Best Actor and Best Supporting Actress categories. Dolphy was again nominated as Best Actor for the Gawad Urian Awards in 1979.

References

Philippine comedy-drama films
1978 films
Films directed by Lino Brocka